Sandton is an upscale commercial and residential district north of the city of Johannesburg, South Africa. It forms part of the City of Johannesburg Metropolitan Municipality. The name of the town came from the combination of two of its suburbs, Sandown and Bryanston. In 1969, Sandton was promulgated as a municipality in its own right, but lost its status as an independent town after the re-organisation of South African local governments after Apartheid ended.

History

Early settlers

Archaeological findings suggest the area, which Sandton comprises today, had originally been occupied by various indigenous groups, before European settlement, most notably the Tswana and, to a lesser extent, Sotho people. The remains of an Iron Age smelter was discovered in Lone Hill, a suburb of northern Sandton.
One of the first Voortrekker parties to settle in the area were the Esterhuysen family on the farm Zandfontein (Afrikaans and Dutch for Sandy Spring or Sand Fountain). A monument to commemorate them may be found just off Adrienne Street in Sandown where the family cemetery is located.
Zandfontein, Driefontein (Afrikaans and Dutch for Three Springs/Fountains) and Rietfontein (Afrikaans and Dutch for Reed Spring or Fountain of Reeds) encumbered what was to become Sandton. The municipal coat of arms of Sandton pays homage to the three farms with three round fountain barrels on its chevron.
In the late 19th-century the Wilhelmi family of Hannover, Germany acquired the farm Driefontein No. 3 while Rietfontein was owned by the Ehler family. The original Driefontein homestead, now within the confines of the Field & Study Centre, was looted during the Anglo-Boer War. The ruins are visible on the northern bank of the Klein Jukskei River. The Wilhemi family, upon return from Germany built the 'new' 1906 Driefontein Farmhouse on what is present-day Fifteenth Street, Parkmore cum Riverclub. The farmhouse served as the icon and headquarters for the now defunct Sandton Historical Foundation and is listed as a City of Johannesburg Owned Heritage Site.

1960s and 1970s
Sandton was established as a separate municipality in 1969 by the office of the Administrator of the Transvaal. It had formerly not formed part of Johannesburg but was managed, in part by the 'parent city' and Pretoria through the North Eastern Peri-Urban Land administration. Initially it was very much a residential area consisting mostly of small holdings with a rural "horsey" lifestyle attracting many of the upper-middle classes and Johannesburg elites. It was subsequently dubbed the "mink and manure" belt.
The Rivonia Trial derives its name from the locality of Liliesleaf Farm within the Sandton suburb where many of the Black freedom fighters such as Nelson Mandela were captured by the South African state and subsequently tried for treason. Rivonia had previously been known as Edenburg and was changed to make itself distinct from Edenburg, Free State. It was named for the surname Riven.
Sandton and its constituencies were traditionally relatively more liberal than surrounds. For example, the motion which never materialised by residents in favour for the inclusion of Alexandra, Gauteng then a demarcated black township in terms of the Group Areas Act, into Sandton's jurisdiction proved troublesome for the National Party government which had a strong constituency in the adjacent town of Randburg.

1980s and 1990s 
The construction of Sandton City by Rapp & Maister (which was eventually taken over by the Liberty Group which still retains 75% of the complex) marked a significant change for the Sandton area. It created rapid commercialisation and industrialisation. Sandton came to symbolise the White Flight movement of Johannesburg and secured itself as Johannesburg's second Central Business District.
After the demise of Apartheid, by 1996, Sandton initially formed part of the interim Eastern Metropolitan Substructure, and in 2000 came to be included, along with the former towns of Randburg and Roodepoort, as part of the newly demarcated City of Johannesburg Metropolitan Municipality thus losing its separate municipal government and town status. Despite this, Sandton is still unofficially earmarked as a distinct region of the city and operates as a macro-suburb.

Role in 21st century Johannesburg

Financial and business centre 

Urban decay in downtown Johannesburg caused many corporate offices to move from the Johannesburg Central Business District to Sandton in the 1990s. It has become the new financial district of South Africa and Johannesburg's premier business centre. Much of the financial focus of Johannesburg has shifted from the Central Business District to Sandton. However, three of South Africa's four largest banks have kept their head offices in downtown Johannesburg, along with Transnet, the transport parastatal. The other bank, Nedbank, has its headquarters in Sandton. A considerable amount of the city's A-grade office space is to be found in Sandton. The JSE Securities Exchange, Johannesburg's stock exchange, relocated its offices to Sandton from the central business district in the late 1990s. Sandton's gain was the central business district's loss: it resulted from urban blight of the downtown Johannesburg area.

Sandton is home to the Sandton Convention Centre, one of the largest convention centres on the continent and primary site of the 2002 World Summit on Sustainable Development (also known as "Rio + 10"), which Johannesburg hosted. The convention centre also hosted the African National Congress' victory celebrations after the party was re-elected at the 2004 election.

Massmart has its head office in the Massmart House in Sandton. Ster-Kinekor has its head office in the Ster-Kinekor Office Park in Eastgate, Sandton. IBM's and Hewlett Packard's main Southern Africa and South Africa offices are in Sandhurst and Rivonia respectively. In 2013, petrochemical giant Sasol announced the development of their new headquarters in Wierda Valley, Sandton.

The Sandton Central commercial node, centred on the suburbs of Sandown and Sandhurst has some of the best and most expensive commercial properties and offices in South Africa.  A number of new developments are underway including 6 Benmore (Capital Hill), Atrium on 5th, Alice Lane and Katherine and West which is situated directly opposite the Sandton Gautrain Station. One of the highest rated Green buildings in South Africa, the Upper Grayston Office Park, is located in Sandton.

Industrial areas situated in Sandton are Wynberg and Kramerville. Kramerville, once a run-down area, is now trendy and is the centre of the design and textiles industry in Sandton.

Tourism and retail hub 
One of the main attractions in Sandton is Sandton City, which ranks among the largest shopping centres in Africa. The completion of this precinct by the Liberty Group was the catalyst for the subsequent development of this entire area. Together with Nelson Mandela Square, the centre, with some 144,000 m2 of shopping space, is one of the largest in the Southern Hemisphere (behind Chadstone Shopping Centre). Much of Johannesburg's business tourism is centred on Sandton, which has various 5-star hotels under the Southern Sun, Hilton, Radisson and Protea brands.

Liberty Group announced in 2008 that Sandton City will receive a R 1,77-billion upgrade. Nelson Mandela Square, formerly known as Sandton Square, was renamed in March 2004, after the unveiling of a 6-metre bronze statue of the former South African president. Liliesleaf Farm, where Nelson Mandela lived in the early 1960s and where many leading political activists were arrested in 1963 and tried as part of the now infamous Rivonia Trial, is just north of Nelson Mandela Square, close to the N1 Highway, off Rivonia Road. Discovery Holdings has, in 2018, completed a large new head office along with shopping mall in the area.

Old Mutual South Africa's head office, as of 2018, is being constructed. A 55-floor mixed use building, The Leonardo, become the tallest building in all of Africa at  following its topping out in 2018.

Concerns have been raised as to whether Sandton has the necessary road and water infrastructure to sustain the massive development that is characteristic of Johannesburg in the 21st century (since the demise of Apartheid and the Group Areas Act).

Sandton Central Management District
The central business area of Sandton is divided into three City Improvement Districts, which have a unified identity called the Sandton Central Management District, branded as Sandton Central. This district is responsible, using additional funds levied on its behalf by the municipality, for the provision of additional services. The Sandton Central Management district provides additional cleaning, law enforcement, beautification and planning services to the area it services.

Transport

Gautrain
Sandton houses the flagship station of the Gautrain rapid rail link. The station is located on the corner of West Street and Rivonia Road. The system has direct connections to OR Tambo International Airport and an inter-city commuter service from Pretoria through Rosebank to Johannesburg Park Station

Gaubus 
Sandton's Gaubus network is very extensive, with direct routes to Fourways, Gallo Manor, Randburg and Rivonia. People can also connect busses and travel to many parts of Centurion, Marlbro, Parktown, Rosebank and Pretoria using the service

Roads 
Sandton has an extensive road network that allows you to get around. The main freeway to get in to the city is the M1 freeway through the M60 offramp at Marlboro Drive, The M40 at Grayston Drive and the M30 at Corlett Drive. To get around, you can use the M9, M27, M71, M75 and M85.

Education

The main campus of the Lycée Jules Verne, a French international school, is in Sandton.
Sandton used to be home of the former Bond University South Africa. Sandton also houses many primary to high schools including:

 Brescia House School
 Bryandale Primary School
 Bryanston High School 
 Bryanston Primary School
 Bryneven Primary School
 Buccleuch Primary School
 Crawford College, Sandton 
 Grayston Preparatory School
 Hyde Park High School
 King David School Sandton
 Montrose Primary School 
 Redhill School 
 Rivonia Primary School
 Sandown High School 
 Sandton Junior School
 Sandton Primary School
 St David's Marist, Inanda 
 St. Peters College 
 St Stithians College 
 Wendywood Primary School
 Wendywood High School
 Amedeo College

Notable people
Sir Donald Gordon
Jani Allan
Leka, Crown Prince of Albania
Daniella Pellegrini
Sibs Shongwe-La Mer
Julius Malema

See also 
Shrine of Our Lady of the Cedars

References

External links

 
 Sandton Central Management District
 Sandton Gautrain station

Johannesburg Region E
Shopping districts and streets in South Africa
Financial districts
1969 establishments in South Africa
Central business districts of South Africa